Justice Muhammad Yusuf Saraf (born 1923) was the Chief Justice of the Azad Kashmir High Court and the author of the voluminous work, Kashmiris Fight for Freedom.  He was born in Baramulla in the then princely state of Jammu and Kashmir, but migrated to Pakistan prior to the Partition of India. He started practising law in Mirpur in 1949, rising to the bench in 1969. He served as the Chief Justice of Azad Kashmir from 1975 to 1980.

Early life
Muhammad Yusuf Saraf was born in Baramulla in 1923. He graduated from St. Joseph's College around 1945. He was the Student Union president and the President of Kashmir Youth Congress, 1943–1945. He was also a secretary for the All-India Students Congress during this period, associated with Sheikh Abdullah's National Conference.

Azad Kashmir movement
In August 1945, Saraf joined the Muslim Conference, which advocated the Jammu and Kashmir's accession to Pakistan. He was appointed as a secretary of the party in 1946.

On 19 July 1947 a convention of the Muslim Conference workers was held at Srinagar, for deciding the party's position on the future of the State. On the previous day, the Working Committee of the party met and passed a resolution asking for the State to remain independent. This is said to have been as per the advice of Muhammad Ali Jinnah. However, Saraf wanted the party to decide in favour of accession to Pakistan. He hastily pencilled a counter-resolution and read it out at the convention, which received overwhelming support from all the younger members of the convention. Consequently, the convention passed a resolution urging the Maharaja to accede to Pakistan.

After the independence of Pakistan in August, Saraf went to Srinagar and met Chaudhary Hamidullah, the acting president of the Muslim Conference. Hamidullah was seeking "sympathetic people" from Punjab and Frontier to attack the state borders in order to draw the State Forces away from Srinagar. In his view, this would give an opportunity for the rebels from Poonch to attack Srinagar itself. Hamidullah asked Saraf to carry a letter to the Frontier chief minister Khan Abdul Qayyum Khan to facilitate such attacks. The Khan, on the other hand, dismissed the proposal as being "foolish". He thought such attacks would give an excuse to India to intervene. He wanted Hamidullah to come in person to discuss the development of a proper plan. Saraf relayed the message to Hamidullah in Srinagar, and then went to stay with a relative in Garhi Habibullah in the N.W.F.P. as he believed a warrant had been issued for his arrest.

While in Garhi Habibullah, Saraf states that he acquired a sizeable quantity of dynamite for the movement. Khurshid Anwar was in the area at that time in connection with organising a tribal invasion of Kashmir. With Anwar's assurance that it would be used for 'the same purpose', Saraf handed over the dynamite to the Khan of Garhi, Muhammad Aslam Khan, which was then presumably used during the tribal invasion.

In October 1947, Saraf went to Rawalpindi, where the Azad Kashmir movement was operating from the Paris Hotel. He was asked to set up a publicity office for the movement in Lahore, which he did, with the assistance of Mirza Basheer-ud-Din Mahmood Ahmad, the head of Ahmadiyya sect, Faiz Ahmed Faiz and other notables of Lahore. The Divisional Commissioner of Lahore, Inamur Rahim, also extended his help. When the Provisional Government of Azad Kashmir was set up on 24 October 1947, Saraf supported it.

Legal career
Saraf received an L.L.B. degree from Aligarh in 1948. He started law practice in Mirpur in 1949. He continued to be involved with the Azad Kashmir affairs, serving on the Electoral Rolls and Polling Sub-Committee set up by the Government of Pakistan, the Azad Kashmir Radio Advisory Committee and the Azad Kashmir Administration Advisory Committee, etc.

In 1969, Saraf was appointed as a judge of the Mirpur Court. He served on the Azad Kashmir Laws Adaptation and Scrutiny Committee and the Azad Kashmir Islamic Laws Committee and the Azad Kashmir Law Commission.

In 1975, Saraf was appointed as the Chief Justice of the Azad Kashmir High Court, serving in this post till 1980.

Works
 Kashmiris Fight for Freedom, Volume 1 (1819–1946), Ferozsons, Lahore, 1977.
 Kashmiris Fight for Freedom, Volume 2 (1947–1978), Ferozsons, Lahore, 1979.

Reception
The volumes received favourable reviews in the Pakistani press. The U. S. Ambassador to Pakistan, Arthur W. Hummel remarked that it appeared to be "a monumental work, representing much research and scholarship". Being a voluminous piece of work covering a long period of history, the volumes are often cited by scholars, such as Victoria Schofield and Christopher Snedden, for historical information. However, Brian Cloughly in A History of the Pakistan Army, said that it is not an unbiased piece of work. Lord Mountbatten is said to have characterised it as 'an exercise in aspersion and innuendo'. Azad Kashmiri journalist Khalid Hasan, who co-edited Memory Lane to Jammu, which included excerpts from Saraf's book, has stated that it is an unsatisfactory account with a "gung-ho, super-patriotic tone", lacking in objectivity.

Death and legacy
Justice Saraf died sometime prior to 1996.

The Sultana Foundation has established a Justice Yusaf Saraf Centre for Research,Rehabilitation & Mainstreaming of Street Children in his honour.

References

Bibliography
 

1923 births
Aligarh Muslim University alumni
Chief Justices of the High Court of Azad Jammu and Kashmir
Pakistan Movement activists from Kashmir
Pakistani people of Kashmiri descent
People from Baramulla
People from Mirpur District
Year of death missing
Writers about the Kashmir conflict